Geijera salicifolia, commonly known as glasswood, green satinheart or scrub wilga, is a species of shrub or tree in the family Rutaceae and is native to Australia, New Guinea and New Caledonia. It has narrow elliptic to egg-shaped leaves, small white flowers in loose groups and oval to more or less spherical fruit, each containing a shiny black seed.

Description

Taxonomy
Geijera salicifolia was first formally described in 1834 by Heinrich Wilhelm Schott in his book Rutaceae - Fragmenta Botanica.

Distribution and habitat
In Australia it is found from Coen in Queensland south to the Budderoo National Park in New South Wales and west to the north-east of the Northern Territory.

Conservation status
This wilga is classified as of "least concern" under the Queensland Government Nature Conservation Act 1992 and the Territory Parks and Wildlife Conservation Act 1976.

Gallery

References

salicifolia
Sapindales of Australia
Flora of New South Wales
Flora of Queensland
Flora of the Northern Territory
Flora of New Caledonia
Flora of New Guinea
Taxa named by Heinrich Wilhelm Schott
Plants described in 1834